A chocolate chip is a small chunk of chocolate.

Chocolate chip may also refer to:

 Chocolate Chip (album), an album by Isaac Hayes
 Chocolate-chip nudibranch, a type of mollusk
 Iris Kyle, a bodybuilder nicknamed Chocolate Chip
 Chocolate-covered potato chips

See also
 Chocolate chip cookie